Frank Madill may refer to:
 Frank Madill (Australian politician)
 Frank Madill (Canadian politician)